Runze Hao (born 3 May 1997) is a Chinese footballer playing as a defender. The last team that he played for was Radnički Niš in the Serbian SuperLiga. He is the son of Hao Haidong, who is the all-time top scorer of the Chinese national team.

Career
Born in Dalian, he played in the youth team of Beijing Guoan before he moved abroad in 2013 and joined the youth team of Spanish side Albacete where he played two seasons. In 2015, he joined Croatian side NK Lokomotiva where, after spending a season playing with youth team, he was upgraded to the main team, but failed to make a debut. In 2017, he signed with Spanish side Recreativo Granada playing most of the time with their reserves team while there. He also spent half season on loan with Portuguese side Louletano D.C. in 2019 before returning to Granada and being signed in summer 2019 by Serbian side Radnički Niš. He made his debut in the 2019–20 Serbian SuperLiga on May 31, 2020, with a goal. Hao started for Radnički Niš in the Serbian Cup quarter final against FK Čukarički on June 4, 2020. He was replaced by Uroš Miloradović at half time. Radnički Niš lost the game 2-3. On June 9, 2020, it was confirmed that Hao was released by Radnički Niš. Amid media speculations that Hao was released due to political pressure from China, Radnički Niš denied the speculations and claimed that Hao left the club after his contract expired on May 30  despite appearing in two matches the following days after.

References

1997 births
Living people
Sportspeople from Dalian
Chinese footballers
Chinese expatriate footballers
Association football midfielders
Beijing Guoan F.C. players
NK Lokomotiva Zagreb players
Expatriate footballers in Croatia
Albacete Balompié players
Club Recreativo Granada players
Expatriate footballers in Spain
Louletano D.C. players
Expatriate footballers in Portugal
FK Radnički Niš players
Serbian SuperLiga players
Chinese expatriate sportspeople in Serbia
Expatriate footballers in Serbia